Dyella caseinilytica is a Gram-negative, aerobic and rod-shaped bacterium from the genus of Dyella which has been isolated from forest soil from the Dinghushan Biosphere Reserve in China.

References

External links
Type strain of Dyella caseinilytica at BacDive -  the Bacterial Diversity Metadatabase

Xanthomonadales
Bacteria described in 2017